Khalid al-Maaly (born April 15, 1956 in as-Samawa, Iraq) is a leading Arab writer, poet and publisher.

References

External links 
Khalid al-Maaly in: NRW Literatur im Netz 

1956 births
Living people
20th-century Iraqi poets
German-language poets
Iraqi emigrants to Germany
Iraqi writers
People from Samawah
German Shia Muslims
21st-century Iraqi poets